The Indianapolis mayoral election of 1983 took place on November 8, 1983, and saw the reelection of Republican William H. Hudnut III to a third term.

In 1982, the two-term limit on the mayoralty was removed (leaving no limits on the number of terms). This enabled Hudnut to run for a, previously prohibited, third term.

Top prospective Democratic candidates declined to run, and Hudnut ultimately faced John J. Sullivan, a newcomer to political campaigning.

Results

References

1983
1983 United States mayoral elections
1983 Indiana elections